Philip Nicholson (25 June 1940 – 10 July 2005), known by his pen name A. J. Quinnell, was an English thriller novelist. He is best known for his novel Man on Fire, which has been adapted to film twice, most recently in 2004 featuring Denzel Washington. Later in life he spent much of his time in Gozo, Malta, where he died.

Life and work
Nicholson travelled throughout his life and several minor characters in his books are based on real people that he encountered on his travels. Nicholson was married three times. His last wife, Elsebeth Egholm, is a Danish mystery novelist. The couple maintained residences on the island of Gozo and in Denmark.

When the author was preparing to publish his first book, Man on Fire, he wanted to keep his real identity a secret. During a conversation in a bar, his agent, Chris Little, told him he could use a pseudonym. The author chose "Quinnell", after the rugby union player Derek Quinnell and "A. J." from the initials of the bartender's son. Nicholson frequented Gleneagles bar in Mġarr, Gozo, the town where the Malta ferry disembarks. He could often be found drinking vodkas with soda. He wrote late at night and through until the morning, always standing up. He also sponsored a local Gozo soccer team and was admired by the Gozitans.

The author's best-known creation was the character of Marcus Creasy, an American-born former member of the French Foreign Legion. The Creasy novels are cult favorites in Japan.

Man on Fire was directly adapted for film twice, in 1987 and 2004. The latter film was adapted into a 2005 Bollywood film. This resulted in a wider demand for Quinnell's books, especially those that feature Creasy (listed in the Bibliography below).

Bibliography

References

External links

 
 A.J. Quinnell Fan Site
 My visit to Gozo and A. J. Quinnell
 Obituary from Times of Malta
 "A.J. Quinnell." at Shueisha (archive)  

Quinell, A.J.
Quinnell, A.J.
Quinnell, A.J.
People from Nuneaton
20th-century English novelists
English male novelists
20th-century English male writers